88P/Howell is a periodic comet with a 5.5 year orbital period. It was discovered on 29 August 1981. In 1975 the comet's perihelion (closest approach to the Sun) was 1.9 AU, but a close approach to Jupiter in 1978 perturbed the perihelion distance closer to the Sun. During the 2009 apparition the comet became as bright as apparent magnitude 8.

It last came to perihelion on 6 April 2015; the next perihelion will be on 26 September 2020. On 14 September 2031 the comet will pass  from Mars.

In response to New Frontiers program call for Mission 4, a team from Johns Hopkins University Applied Physics Laboratory (JHUAPL) submitted a mission concept proposal called Comet Rendezvous, Sample Acquisition, Investigation, and Return (CORSAIR) that would perform a sample return from comet 88P/Howell.

During the 2020 apparition the comet has brightened to about apparent magnitude 10.7 and should reach magnitude 9.

References

External links 
 Orbital simulation from JPL (Java) / Horizons Ephemeris
 88P at Kronk's Cometography
 88P at CometBase database

Periodic comets
0088
20150406
Comets in 2020
19810829